Arthur Edwin Hill-Trevor, 1st Baron Trevor (4 November 1819 – 25 December 1894), styled as Lord Edwin Hill until 1862 and as Lord Edwin Hill-Trevor from 1862 to 1880, was a long-standing Anglo-Irish Conservative Member of Parliament.

Hill-Trevor was the third son of Arthur Hill, 3rd Marquess of Downshire, and his wife Lady Maria (née Windsor). He was elected to the House of Commons for County Down in 1845, a seat he held for the next 35 years.

In 1862, on the death of their kinsman Arthur Hill-Trevor, 3rd Viscount Dungannon (on whose death the viscountcy became extinct) this branch of the Hill family succeeded to the Trevor and Dungannon estates. By arrangement parts of the estates, including Brynkinalt in Wales, passed to Lord Edwin, who assumed by Royal licence the additional surname of Trevor. In 1880 he was raised to the peerage as Baron Trevor, of Brynkinalt in the County of Denbigh.

As Lord Edwin Hill-Trevor, Lord Trevor was a Captain in the North Shropshire Yeomanry Cavalry, promoted Major in 1862, but retired from the regiment prior to its amalgamation into the unified Shropshire Yeomanry regiment in 1872.

Lord Trevor married, firstly, Mary Emily, daughter of Sir Richard Sutton, 2nd Baronet, in 1848. After her death in 1855 he married, secondly, the Hon. Mary Catherine, daughter of Reverend the Hon. Alfred Curzon, in 1858. Trevor died in December 1894, aged 75, and was succeeded in the barony by his son from his first marriage, Arthur. Lady Trevor died in 1912.

Notes

References 
Kidd, Charles, Williamson, David (editors). Debrett's Peerage and Baronetage (1990 edition). New York: St Martin's Press, 1990, 
CricketArchive: Lord Edwin Hill

External links 
 
Photo of Edwin Hill-Trevor at National Portrait Gallery

1819 births
1894 deaths
Barons in the Peerage of the United Kingdom
Irish Conservative Party MPs
English cricketers
Marylebone Cricket Club cricketers
Members of the Parliament of the United Kingdom for County Down constituencies (1801–1922)
Shropshire Yeomanry officers
Treasurers of the Household
Hill, Edwin
Hill, Edwin
Hill, Edwin
Hill, Edwin
Hill-Trevor, Edwin
Hill-Trevor, Edwin
Hill-Trevor, Edwin
Hill-Trevor, Edwin
UK MPs who were granted peerages
Hill-Trevor, Edwin
Hill-Trevor, Edwin
Edwin
Hill-Trevor, Edwin
Peers of the United Kingdom created by Queen Victoria